Civilian is the third studio album by indie band Wye Oak. It was released on March 8, 2011, by Merge Records in the United States and City Slang in Europe.

The A.V. Club named Civilian the best album of 2011.

Release
On February 27, 2011, Wye Oak announced the release of their new album, along with the title track.

Music video
The music video for "Fish" was released on April 8, 2011.

On September 2, 2011, Wye Oak released the music video for "Holy Holy". It was directed by Jeremy Johnstone and produced by Greg Beauchamp.

In popular culture
An edited version of the title track of Civilian was featured in the 2011 trailer for the second season of The Walking Dead and also the closing scene of the second season episode "18 Miles Out" (2012). "Civilian" was also featured in the final scene of the 13th episode of the North American remake of Being Human (2011), in the episode "The Man Who Sailed Around His Soul" of One Tree Hill (2011), in the episode "Thy Will Be Done" of Underbelly: Badness (2012), in the ending scene of the Animal Kingdom third season episode "Prey", and in the final scene of the Longmire season 4 finale "What Happens on the Rez..." (2015), as well in the films Safety Not Guaranteed (2012) and The Odd Way Home (2013).

Critical reception

Civilian was met with "universal acclaim" reviews from critics. At Metacritic, which assigns a weighted average rating out of 100 to reviews from mainstream publications, this release received an average score of 81 based on 20 reviews.

Tim Sendra of AllMusic said: "The albums sounds brighter and better recorded, Wasner's songs are crisper and more memorable with an extra amount of sadness added, the performances invested with a level of intensity and fiery soul that had only been hinted at before."

Accolades

Track listing

Personnel
Credits adapted from Tidal.

Jenn Wasner – vocals, guitar, bass, keyboards, percussion, production
Andy Stack – drums, bass, guitar, keys, percussion, production, engineering
Alan Douches – mastering
John Congleton – mixing
Chris Freeland – engineering
Mickey Freeland – engineering
Michael Patrick O'Leary – cover photo
Cady Bean-Smith – cover design

Charts

References

2011 albums
Wye Oak albums
City Slang albums
Merge Records albums
Albums produced by John Congleton